Savage Sam is a 1963 American Western film sequel to Old Yeller based on the 1962 novel of the same name by Fred Gipson. Norman Tokar directed the live-action film, which was released by Walt Disney Productions on June 1, 1963. It did not enjoy the success of the original.

Plot
In 1870, 18-year-old Travis Coates (Tommy Kirk) is left in charge of his precocious 12-year-old brother, Arliss (Kevin Corcoran), on the family farm in Southwest Texas, while their parents visit an ailing grandmother. While Arliss and his dog, Savage Sam, are tracking a bobcat, Travis is warned by Bud Searcy (Jeff York) that renegade Apaches are in the area. When Travis joins Bud's 17-year-old granddaughter, Lisbeth (Marta Kristen), in a search for Arliss, all three are captured by a band of Apaches led by a Comanche. The boys' Uncle Beck Coates (Brian Keith) witnesses the scene and manages to wound the Indian leader, but Beck's horse is shot by one of the braves, allowing the Comanche and his followers to escape with the captives. Beck alerts the U. S. Cavalry, but the Indians split into three groups and ride for the hills; in the confusion, Travis escapes but is knocked unconscious and left to die. Beck and his posse of five find Travis and his dog, set out in pursuit of the other captives, and eventually find the Indians in a valley fighting over Lisbeth. Although posse member Pack Underwood (Royal Dano), bent on revenge for the massacre of his family, fires a shot that alerts the Indians to their planned ambush, the youngsters are saved and the renegades captured.

Cast
 Brian Keith as Uncle Beck Coates
 Tommy Kirk as Travis Coates
 Kevin Corcoran as Arliss Coates
 Dewey Martin as Lester White
 Jeff York as Bud Searcy
 Marta Kristen as Lisbeth Searcy
 Rafael Campos as Young Warrior
 Slim Pickens as Willy Crup
 Royal Dano as Pack Underwood
 Rodolfo Acosta as Bandy Legs
 Pat Hogan as Broken Nose
 Dean Fredericks as Comanche Chief
 Brad Weston as Ben Todd

Behind the scenes
Walt Disney bought the film rights to the novel in September 1961, prior to its publication in February 1962. The price was $25,000.

Gipson was then hired to write the screenplay. He started in October at $1,250 a week.  Gipson was an alcoholic by this time and he was frequently incapacitated by rages.

On June 14, 1962, Mike Gipson, Fred Gipson's son, found the Gipson family dog, the inspiration for Savage Sam, chained and clubbed to death in a shed behind the new family home. The next day, Mike returned to university in shock, and committed suicide that weekend. Gipson's wife would leave him a month after the premiere of Savage Sam.

It was one of the first movies from director Norman Tokar. "I got him from TV," said Walt Disney. "I like young talent. When people get to be institutions, they direct pictures with their left hand and do something else with their right."

Pat Hogan appears as tribesman Broken Nose. Dean Fredericks, formerly Steve Canyon on NBC, played a Comanche chief in this film.

Filming started August 6, 1962. It was mostly shot around the San Fernando Valley.

Critical reception
The film received poor reviews and fell short of box office expectations, paling in comparison with Old Yeller. According to Gipson's biographer, ""criticized as clichéd and overdirected, the production was especially faulted for inconsistency with Gipson's tone."

The Washington Post called it a "dogged, listless effort." "Action melodrama with a formula plot" said the Los Angeles Times. The Chicago Tribune said "the members of the cast are all capable enough, but they are all handicapped by a lurid plot which looks like it was made up by all the action scenes in a bunch of old television scripts."

See also
List of American films of 1963
Old Yeller, 1957 film

References

Notes

External links
 

1963 films
1963 Western (genre) films
American Western (genre) films
Walt Disney Pictures films
Films about dogs
1960s English-language films
Films directed by Norman Tokar
Films produced by Walt Disney
Films scored by Oliver Wallace
1960s American films